The Norie-Miller Baronetcy, of Cleeve in the County of Perth, was a title in the Baronetage of the United Kingdom. It was created on 7 February 1936 for the insurance magnate and Liberal National politician Francis Norie-Miller. Claud Norie-Miller, the eldest son of Francis Norie-Miller, was killed on active service in the First World War in 1917 so the second Baronet was Francis' younger son, Stanley, who had followed him into the insurance business. Stanley inherited the title on his father's death on 4 July 1947 but, having no son, the baronetcy became extinct with his death in 1973.

Norie-Miller baronets, of Cleeve (1936)

 Sir Francis Norie-Miller, 1st Baronet (1859–1947)
 Sir Stanley Norie-Miller, 2nd Baronet (1888–1973)

Both are buried together in Wellshill Cemetery in north Perth. The grave is on the eastern slope facing a north–south path.

See also
Norie-Miller Walk

References

Extinct baronetcies in the Baronetage of the United Kingdom